Tlepolemus is a genus of longhorn beetles of the subfamily Lamiinae, containing the following species:

 Tlepolemus pilosus (Thunberg, 1787)
 Tlepolemus puerulus Thomson, 1864

References

Crossotini
Cerambycidae genera